Coluber constrictor flaviventris, commonly known as the eastern yellow-bellied racer, is a subspecies of the eastern racer,  non-venomous  colubrid snake. It is endemic to North America.

Description
The eastern yellow-bellied racer is a thin-bodied snake, capable of attaining a total length of 1.5 metres (60 inches). As an adult, its color is an olive grey-green with a yellow underside. As a juvenile it is remarkably different, having a tan or cream-colored body with brown or grey blotches. The color gradually changes as the snake ages, becoming solid olive grey-green. Authors disagree as to when this transformation is complete, from 1½ to three years old, and from 18 to 30 inches (46–76 cm) in total length.

Geographic Range
The eastern yellow-bellied racer is found in the United States, from the states of Montana, North Dakota, South Dakota, east to Iowa, south to Texas and southeast to Louisiana. It is also found in isolated populations in Canada.

Conservation status
Coluber constrictor flaviventris is listed as an endangered species in the province of Saskatchewan.

Behavior
Racers are diurnal, active predators. They are fast moving and are often quick to bite if handled. They generally eat rodents, lizards and frogs, but as juveniles they will also consume various kinds of soft-bodied insects. They are fairly nervous snakes, and as such, do not typically fare well in captivity.

References

Further reading
 Say, T. in James, E. (1823). Account of an Expedition from Pittsburgh to the Rocky Mountains, Performed in the Years 1819, 1820. By Order of the Hon. J.C. Calhoun, Secretary of War, Under the Command of Maj. S.H. Long, of the U.S. Top. Engineers. Compiled from the Notes of Major Long, Mr. T. Say, and other Gentlemen of the Party. In Three Volumes. Volume I. Longman, Hurst, Reese, Orme, and Brown. London. vii + 344 pp. (Coluber flaviventris, pp. 167, 337–338.)

External links
Herps of Texas: Coluber constrictor

Colubrids
Reptiles of the United States
Fauna of the Plains-Midwest (United States)
Fauna of the Southeastern United States
Reptiles of Canada